The women's 200 metre backstroke event at the 2004 Olympic Games was contested at the Olympic Aquatic Centre of the Athens Olympic Sports Complex in Athens, Greece on August 19 and 20.

Zimbabwe's Kirsty Coventry added gold to her silver and bronze medals by a storming victory in this event, breaking an African record time of 2:09.19. Russia's Stanislava Komarova took home the silver at 2:09.72, while Japan's Reiko Nakamura and Germany's Antje Buschschulte shared their triumph for the bronze medal, in a joint time of 2:09.88. British swimmer and world champion Katy Sexton, on the other hand, finished outside the medals in seventh place, with a time of 2:12.11. Since Zimbabwe made its official debut in 1980, Coventry also became the nation's first athlete in its history to claim an individual Olympic medal.

Records
Prior to this competition, the existing world and Olympic records were as follows.

Results

Heats

Semifinals

Semifinal 1

Semifinal 2

Final

References

External links
Official Olympic Report

W
2004 in women's swimming
Women's events at the 2004 Summer Olympics